Golden Star or Golden Stars may refer to:

Botany
Golden Star (carambola)
Triteleia ixioides, flower in Triteleia known as "golden star"

Business
Golden Star Ferries, Greece
Golden Star Resources
Golden Star (newspaper), from British Columbia, Canada

Music
Golden Star, 2005 compilation album series featuring Timi Yuro and other artists
 Golden Stars (Baccara album) compilation album
Golden Star, album by Raju Singh

Sports 
Shandong Golden Stars

Football 
Golden Star (football club), from Martinique
Erakor Golden Star F.C., from Vanuatu
Jigawa Golden Stars F.C., from Nigeria

See also
Golden Star Festival, an event in the Tibetan calendar to wash away sins